The men's super-G at the 1999 Asian Winter Games was held on 31 January 1999 at the Yongpyong Resort in South Korea.

Schedule
All times are Korea Standard Time (UTC+09:00)

Results
Legend
DNF — Did not finish
DSQ — Disqualified

References

Results

External links
Schedule

Men super-G